The United Kingdom Atomic Energy Authority is a UK government research organisation responsible for the development of fusion energy. It is an executive non-departmental public body of the Department for Business, Energy and Industrial Strategy (BEIS).

The authority focuses on United Kingdom and European fusion energy research programmes at Culham in Oxfordshire, including the world's most powerful operating fusion device, the Joint European Torus (JET). The research aims to develop fusion power as a commercially viable, environmentally responsible energy source for the future.

A record 59 megajoules of sustained fusion energy was demonstrated by scientists and engineers working on JET in December 2021.

United Kingdom Atomic Energy Authority owns the Culham Science Centre and has a stake in the Harwell Campus, and is involved in the development of both sites as locations for science and innovation-based business.

On its formation in 1954, the authority was responsible for the United Kingdom's entire nuclear programme, both civil and defence, as well as the policing of nuclear sites. It made pioneering developments in nuclear (fission) power, overseeing the development of nuclear technology and performing much scientific research. However, since the early 1970s its areas of work have been gradually reduced, with functions transferred to other government organisations as well as to the private sector.

UKAEA has also been involved in undertaking safety and reliability assessments for outside bodies, due to its long running experience in such work within the nuclear field.

History
The authority was established on 19 July 1954 when the Atomic Energy Authority Act 1954 received Royal Assent and gave the authority the power "to produce, use and dispose of atomic energy and carry out research into any matters therewith".

The United Kingdom Atomic Energy Authority was formed from the Ministry of Supply, Department of Atomic Energy and inherited its facilities and most of its personnel on its formation.

The first chairman was Sir Edwin Plowden, with board members running the three major divisions:
 Industrial Group: Sir Christopher Hinton
 Research Group: Sir John Cockcroft
 Weapons Group: Sir William Penney

United Kingdom Atomic Energy Authority inherited nearly 20,000 employees, which doubled to 41,000 by 1961. Most of United Kingdom Atomic Energy Authority's early activities were related to the United Kingdom's nuclear weapons programme, and the need for plutonium, highly enriched uranium, and materials for hydrogen bombs. Between 1952 and 1958 UKAEA carried out 21 nuclear weapon tests in Australia and the Pacific.

Following the Atomic Energy Authority Act 1971, the authority was split into three, with only research activities remaining with the Authority. The Radiochemical Centre Ltd took over production of medical and industrial radioisotopes and was later privatised in 1982 as Amersham plc. British Nuclear Fuels Ltd (BNFL) took over nuclear fuel and weapons material producing activities: the manufacturing plant at Springfields, the enrichment plant at Capenhurst, the spent-fuel facility at Windscale, and the dual-purpose Calder Hall and Chapelcross military plutonium producing reactors.

The Atomic Energy Authority (Weapons Group) Act 1973 transferred responsibility for management of the UK's nuclear deterrent, including the Atomic Weapons Research Establishment at Aldermaston, directly to the Ministry of Defence.

In 1982 the authority was involved in the creation of Nirex, to develop and operate radioactive waste disposal facilities in the United Kingdom.

The Atomic Energy Authority Act 1986 put the authority into trading fund mode, requiring it to act and account as though it were a commercial enterprise and become self-financing.

The authority was then split again by the Atomic Energy Authority Act 1995, with the more commercial parts transferred into a public company AEA Technology, which was then floated on the London Stock Exchange in 1996. The nuclear facilities used for the UK's research and development programme, which held large decommissioning liabilities, were retained. The role of the authority became to decommission these nuclear assets and to restore the environment around the sites. From the early 1990s the authority completed more decommissioning work than anyone in Europe, and had considerable success in regenerating former nuclear sites for commercial use.

Following the Energy Act 2004, on 1 April 2005 the UK's specialist nuclear police force, the UK Atomic Energy Authority Constabulary, was reconstituted as the Civil Nuclear Constabulary. Responsibility for the force was also removed from the authority and transferred to the Civil Nuclear Police Authority. The 2004 Act also established the Nuclear Decommissioning Authority (NDA), which on 1 April 2005 took ownership and responsibility for the liabilities relating to the cleanup of UK nuclear sites. The authority became a contractor for the NDA for the decommissioning work at Dounreay, Harwell, Windscale, Winfrith and the JET facilities at Culham.

On 1 April 2008, the Authority announced a major re-structuring to meet its decommissioning obligations with the NDA. A new wholly owned subsidiary, UKAEA Limited, was formed with established expertise from the existing company, to focus on nuclear decommissioning and environmental restoration management and consultancy in the United Kingdom and international markets.

At the same time, Dounreay Site Restoration Limited (DSRL) was formed out of the existing Authority team at Dounreay and was licensed by the Health and Safety Executive to operate the site and carry out its decommissioning under the Authority's management. DSRL became a subsidiary of United Kingdom Atomic Energy Authority Limited.

In parallel with these changes, the site at Windscale in Cumbria was transferred to Sellafield Ltd, a site licence company under contract to the NDA, following close review and scrutiny by the Health and Safety Executive and environmental and security regulators. The majority of authority employees at the site transferred to Sellafield Ltd.

On 2 February 2009, the authority announced the next stage in restructuring. Research Sites Restoration Limited (RSRL), was formed from the existing teams at Harwell in Oxfordshire and Winfrith in Dorset and licensed by the Health and Safety Executive to operate those sites. RSRL continued the decommissioning programmes for Harwell and Winfrith on behalf of the NDA. RSRL also became a subsidiary of UKAEA Limited.

In October 2009, Babcock International Group plc acquired UKAEA Limited, the nuclear clean-up subsidiary of the authority, including its subsidiary companies DSRL and RSRL.

In 2009 the Culham Centre for Fusion Energy (CCFE) was launched as the new name for the home of United Kingdom fusion research.

In 2014 UKAEA announced the creation of a new branch of research, using expertise gained from the remote handling system created for JET to form a new centre for robotics known as RACE (Remote Applications in Challenging Environments).
 
The Authority has continued to expand its facilities at Culham in recent years, with the opening of a Materials Research Facility in 2016 and creation of the Oxfordshire Advanced Skills apprentice training centre.

Current activities 
United Kingdom Atomic Energy Authority states its mission as "To lead the delivery of sustainable fusion energy and maximise the scientific and economic benefit." Its research programmes include a number of laboratories and other facilities at the Culham site.

Facilities and programmes

Culham Centre for Fusion Energy (CCFE) 

The UK's national laboratory for fusion research, CCFE undertakes plasma theory and modelling studies to establish the physics basis for future fusion powerplants. It also studies the materials and engineering technology of tokamak fusion reactors. The centrepiece of CCFE's programme is the MAST Upgrade spherical tokamak experiment - the successor to the MAST device - which is expected to begin operation in 2019.

CCFE also operates and maintains the Joint European Torus (JET) for its research partners around Europe, and is a member of the co-ordinated R&D programme led by the EUROfusion consortium.

Materials Research Facility 
UKAEA's Materials Research Facility carries out micro-characterisation of radioactive materials for researchers in both fusion energy and nuclear fission. It is open to users from academic and commercial organisations, aiming to bridge the gap between university laboratories and those at nuclear licensed sites. It is part of the National Nuclear Users' Facility and has received funding from the Henry Royce Institute.

Oxfordshire Advanced Skills 
A partnership between United Kingdom Atomic Energy Authority and the Science & Technology Facilities Council, Oxfordshire Advanced Skills is an apprentice training centre located at Culham Science Centre. It offers training for technicians in engineering and hi-tech disciplines, with the intention of providing employers with highly skilled recruits ready to enter the workplace. Training is provided by the Manufacturing Technology Centre.

Remote Applications in Challenging Environments (RACE) 

RACE is a test facility for robotics and autonomous systems. It grew out of UKAEA's remote handling operations at the JET nuclear fusion device, which date back to the 1990s. The UK Government funded the construction of the RACE centre at Culham with the intention of taking the knowledge gained at JET into other industries with 'challenging environments' where it is difficult for humans to perform work. RACE currently works with organisations in nuclear fusion and fission, with large physics facilities and with autonomous vehicle developers.

Spherical Tokamak for Energy Production (STEP) 

The £220 million STEP programme aims to accelerate the delivery of fusion power to the energy market. STEP will be a prototype powerplant capable of demonstrating fusion as a viable technology for electricity generation. It uses the compact 'spherical tokamak' concept developed by UKAEA at Culham Centre for Fusion Energy. STEP is currently in a five-year conceptual design phase and is expected to be constructed and operational by 2040.

H3AT and FTF 
In December 2017, UKAEA announced plans for two further fusion research centres: Hydrogen-3 Advanced Technology (H3AT) and Fusion Technology Facilities. H3AT, located at Culham, will study the processing and storage of tritium, one of the two fuels expected to supply commercial fusion reactors. The Fusion Technology Facilities, based at both Culham and at a new UKAEA Yorkshire site in Rotherham, South Yorkshire, carries out thermal, mechanical, hydraulic and electromagnetic tests on prototype components to replicate the conditions experienced inside fusion reactors.

Coat of Arms

Locations
Authority site locations:

 Culham Science Centre, Culham, Oxfordshire
 Harwell Science and Innovation Campus, Oxfordshire
 Advanced Manufacturing Park, Rotherham

Historical site locations:

 Atomic Weapons Establishment, Aldermaston, Berkshire
 Capenhurst (near Chester)
 Chapelcross nuclear power station, Chapelcross (near Annan, Dumfries and Galloway)
 Culcheth (near Warrington)
 Daresbury Laboratory, Daresbury (near Warrington)
 Dounreay, Caithness
 Windscale (now part of Sellafield)
 Risley (near Warrington)
 Springfields (near Preston)
 Winfrith, Dorset

See also
 Atomic Energy Authority Act
 Atomic Energy Research Establishment
 Atomic Weapons Research Establishment
 Nuclear weapons and the United Kingdom
 BNFL
 John Dolphin CBE
 Nuclear Decommissioning Authority
 Nuclear power in the United Kingdom
 UK Atomic Energy Authority Constabulary
 Campaign for Nuclear Disarmament
 United States Atomic Energy Commission

References

External links
 
Culham Centre for Fusion Energy website
 Dounreay Site Restoration Limited (DSRL) Website
 Research Sites Restoration Limited (RSRL) Website
 UKAEA History – The First Fifty Years
 Harry Cartwright - Daily Telegraph obituary

Culham Centre for Fusion Energy
Department for Business, Energy and Industrial Strategy
Government agencies established in 1954
Governmental nuclear organizations
1954 establishments in the United Kingdom
1954 in technology
1954 in the environment
Non-departmental public bodies of the United Kingdom government
Nuclear energy in the United Kingdom
Organisations based in Oxfordshire
Science and technology in Oxfordshire
Scientific organizations established in 1954